Maneswar is a town in Sambalpur district, Odisha, India, situated  from Sambalpur. The postal code of Maneswar 768005. Nearby villages of this town are Sindurpank (3.6 km), Jhankarpali (4.2 km), Gunderpur (4.2 km), Kabrapali (7.3 km), Batemura (7.8 km), chhatabar (6.0 km) Ghenupali (8.0 km).

There is a temple dedicated to Shiva on the banks of the Malti River at Maneswar. The Maneswar High School is  located on Dhama road.

References

Villages in Sambalpur district